The 2016 Tour of Oman was a road cycling stage race that took place between 16 and 21 February 2016 in Oman. It was the seventh edition of the Tour of Oman and is rated as a 2.HC race as part of the 2016 UCI Asia Tour. The previous year's champion, Rafael Valls, was not present to defend his title.

Teams 

Eighteen teams were invited to take part in the race. These included nine UCI WorldTeams and nine UCI Professional Continental teams.

Pre-race favourites 

The Tour of Oman comes towards the beginning of the road cycling season. It follows two other races in the Middle East: the Dubai Tour and the Tour of Qatar, which in 2016 were won by Marcel Kittel and Mark Cavendish ( respectively. The Dubai Tour and the Tour of Qatar are focused particularly on sprinters and classics riders, but the Tour of Oman is an opportunity for the climbers to compete for overall victory, with the climb of Jebel Akhdar normally decisive. Many riders who compete for the Grand Tours and the Ardennes classics start the race as part of their preparation, although increased competition from early-season European races meant that the start list for the 2016 Tour of Oman was not as strong as in some previous editions.

Lotto–Soudal was not among the teams invited to the race, so Valls was not present to defend his title. In his absence, the contenders for overall victory included Vincenzo Nibali, who had won on Jebel Akhdar in 2012, and Richie Porte, who had won the queen stage of the Tour Down Under. Other strong riders included the  riders Romain Bardet and Domenico Pozzovivo, 's Tom Dumoulin, 's Dan Martin, 's Rui Costa and 's Eduardo Sepúlveda.

The varied stages in the Tour of Oman meant that several different kinds of riders started the race. These included sprinters such as Sam Bennett, Alexander Kristoff, Sacha Modolo, Andrea Guardini (Astana) and Moreno Hofland. The hilly finishes also attracted classics riders such as Greg Van Avermaet (BMC), Davide Rebellin and Edvald Boasson Hagen.

Route 

The 2016 race is scheduled to include six stages. This included one flat stage, three hilly stages, one stage with an uphill finish to Qurayyat and the queen stage finishing on Jebel Akhdar (the Green Mountain) where previous editions of the race have been decided. The climb of Jebel Akhdar was extended from previous races: it continued  from the former finish line up to the top of the climb.

Classification leadership 

There were five principal classifications in the 2016 Tour of Oman.

The first and most important was the general classification; the winner of this is considered the overall winner of the race. It is calculated by adding together each rider's times on each stage, then applying bonuses. Bonuses are awarded for coming in the top three on a stage (10 seconds for the winner, 6 seconds for the second placed rider and 4 seconds for the rider in third) or at intermediate sprints (3 seconds, 2 seconds and 1 second for the top three riders). The rider in the lead of the general classification wears a red jersey.

The second competition is the points classification. This is calculated by awarding points for the top 10 riders at the finish of each stage (15 points to the winner down to 1 point for the rider in tenth place) and to the top three at intermediate sprints (3 points, 2 points and 1 point). The rider with the highest points total is the leader of the classification and wears a green jersey.

The young rider classification is open to those born on or after 1 January 1990. The young rider ranked highest in the general classification is the leader of the young rider classification and wears a white jersey.

The combativity classification is based on points won at intermediate sprints and classified climbs along the route. Points are awarded to the top three riders across each sprint or climb (3 points, 2 points and 1 point). The rider with the most accumulated points is the leader of the classification and wears a white jersey with red and green sections.

The final competition is the team classification. On each stage, each team is awarded a time based on the cumulative time of its top three riders. The times for each stage are then added together and the team with the lowest total time is the leader of the team classification. There is no jersey awarded for this classification.

References

External links 

 
 Le Tour

2016
Tour of Oman
Tour of Oman